Kosa Dvukh Pilotov Island (коса Двух Пилотов, "Two Pilots' Sandspit") is a long and narrow island in the Chukchi Sea. It is located along the coast of the Chukotka Peninsula in the Chukotka Autonomous Okrug.

It is a long extended bar or spit between the Chukchi Sea and the lagoons of Amguema (Амгуэма) and Tynkergynpil'gyn (Тынкэргынпильгын), coastal lakes which are frozen most of the year.

The island is named after pilot Carl Ben Eielson and mechanic Earl Borland who crashed near it in 1929.

The southeastern section of this island is also known as "Ostrov Dalstroy" after the Soviet organization Dalstroy.

See also 
 List of islands of Russia

References

External links 
 Location
 Ship wreck near Kosa Dvukh Pilotov
 Evolution of the coastal zone of the Eurasian Arctic seas

Islands of the Chukchi Sea
Islands of Chukotka Autonomous Okrug
Spits of Russia
Landforms of Chukotka Autonomous Okrug